The AN/TPS-80 Ground/Air Task Oriented Radar (G/ATOR) is the United States Marine Corps next-generation Air Surveillance/Air Defense and Air Traffic Control (ATC) Radar. The mobile active electronically scanned array radar system is currently being developed by Northrop Grumman and was expected to reach initial operating capability in August 2016.

Mission and Description

The Ground/Air Task Oriented Radar (G/ATOR) is a single material solution for the mobile Multi-Role Radar System and Ground Weapons Locating Radar (GWLR) requirements. It is a three-dimensional, short/medium-range multi-role radar designed to detect unmanned aerial systems, cruise missiles, air-breathing targets, rockets, artillery, and mortars. G/ATOR is said to satisfy the warfighter's expeditionary needs across the Marine Air-Ground Task Force spectrum replacing five legacy radar systems with a single solution.  The five Marine Corps legacy radar systems being replaced by this multi-function capability include: the AN/TPS-63 (air defence), AN/TPS-73 (air-traffic control), AN/MPQ-62 (short-range air defence), AN/TPQ-46 (counter-fire target acquisition) and UPS-3 (target tracking). Additionally, it will augment the AN/TPS-59 long-range radar.

The Program Executive Office (PEO), Land Systems Marine Corps is executing the G/ATOR program as an evolutionary acquisition program consisting of four capabilities, referred to as blocks.
 Block 1 will complete the primary material system acquisition and can support the short-range air defence and air surveillance mission, as well as provide an Air Defence/Surveillance Radar (AD/SR) capability to the MAGTF Commander.
 Block 2 will include software to perform the missions of ground counter-battery/fire control (Ground Locating Weapons Radar).
 Block 3 capabilities are not currently defined or resourced, and have been deferred indefinitely.
 Block 4 will provide air traffic control capabilities (Expeditionary Airport Surveillance Radar).

G/ATOR provides real-time radar measurement data to the Tactical Air Operations Module, Common Aviation Command and Control System (CAC2S), Composite Tracking Network, and Advanced Field Artillery Tactical Data System.

The G/ATOR baseline system configuration consists of three subsystems:
 Communications Equipment Group (CEG). The CEG provides the ability to communicate with and control the radar and is mounted on a High Mobility Multi-purpose Wheeled Vehicle.
 Radar Equipment Group (REG). The REG consists of a phased-array radar mounted on an integrated trailer. The trailer is towed by the Medium Tactical Vehicle Replacement (MTVR).
 Power Equipment Group (PEG). The PEG includes a 60-kilowatt generator and associated power cables mounted on a pallet. The generator pallet is carried by the MTVR.

Development

Development of the G/ATOR began in September 2005 when the Marine Corps awarded a $7.9 million contract to Northrop Grumman Electronic Systems. Initial design requirements required planning for short-range air surveillance, counter-battery fire and target acquisition, and sensor networking.  The requirement also required Block 1 to allow for incremental implementation of the following blocks without equipment or software redesign.

In 2009, a $14 million cost overrun for the G/ATOR, was attributed to requirements creep and the increasing cost of scarce materials required in advanced electronic components. In 2012 the Marine Corps and Northrop Grumman began Block 2 development, beginning with upgrading the Block 1 equipment and software for performing GWLR requirements.

The G/ATOR program obtained a successful Milestone C decision in March 2014. In October 2014, a 207.3 million dollar low rate initial production (LRIP) contract was awarded to Northrop Grumman for the first lot of four systems. In March 2015, another contract worth $113 million was awarded to produce two additional systems to be delivered in October 2017.

In September 2015, the Marine Corps awarded Northrop Grumman a $58.7 million contract to incorporate and test the GWLR mode for the G/ATOR.

In September 2016, the Marine Corps awarded Northrop Grumman a $375 million contract for nine additional LRIP systems that will incorporate gallium nitride (GaN) technology.

On June 10, 2019, the Marine Corps awarded Northrop Grumman a $958 million contract for full-rate production of 30 GaN G/ATOR Systems.

A total of 57 G/ATOR systems are planned for procurement.

On December 6, 2019, the Marine Corps awarded Northrop Grumman a $188 million contract for the firm-fixed-price portion of a previously-awarded contract (M67854-19-C-0043). This modification is for the purchase of six Gallium Nitride full-rate-production systems and associated travel in support of Program Executive Officer Land Systems, Quantico, Virginia.

Saab is subcontracted by Northrop Grumman Corporation and has delivered major subsystems and assemblies as well as software since Lot1 and has been part of the development since originally contracted in 2007.

Main characteristics
 Multipurpose Tracking & Surveillance Radar
 Proven S-band (2–4 GHz), 3D Radar
 Detects fixed- and rotary-wing aircraft, cruise missiles, and UAVs
 Performs ATC and fire finder roles
 High mobility, transportability, and reliability
 The entire system can be airlifted into an operational site by three CH-53E Super Stallion heavy-lift helicopters or MV-22B Osprey tilt-rotor aircraft, or by a single C-130 transport.
 The system is required to be set up on-site within 45 minutes.
 Provides identification of friendly aircraft using a Telephonics UPX-44 IFF (Identification Friend or Foe) integrated with the main radar.

Nomenclature
Per the Joint Electronics Type Designation System (JETDS), the nomenclature AN/TPS-80 is thus derived:
 "AN/" indicating Army/Navy (Marines) -- a system nomenclature derived from the JETDS
 "T" for 'transportable', indicating it is carried by, but not an integral part of, a vehicle (compare with 'V' for vehicle-mounted)
 "P" indicating a RADAR
 "S" is for Detecting, Range and Bearing, Search
 "80" is the 80'th version of this family of TPS radars

See also
Counter-battery radar
AN/TPQ-36 Firefinder radar
AN/TPQ-37 Firefinder radar
ARTHUR (radar)
AN/TPQ-53 Quick Reaction Capability Radar
AN/MPQ-64 Sentinel

References

External links
Northrop Grumman.com (G/ATOR)

Ground radars
Military radars of the United States
Northrop Grumman radars
Weapon Locating Radar
Targeting (warfare)
Military radars of the United States Marine Corps